The following is a list of events that occurred in Antarctica in 2015.

Events
January - Reports emerge of a 2-kilometre (1.2 mi) circular structure, supposedly a meteorite crater, on the surface snow of King Baudouin Ice Shelf. Satellite images suggest that the crater is probably at least 25 years old.
June - Norway formally defines the area covered by Queen Maud Land.
date unknown - Antarctica Marathon

References

 
2010s in Antarctica
Years of the 21st century in Antarctica